West Liberty is an unincorporated community in Union Township, Howard County, Indiana, in the United States.

History
West Liberty was platted in 1853.

References

Populated places in Howard County, Indiana